The Bezirk Kitzbühel is an administrative district (Bezirk) in Tyrol, Austria. It borders Bavaria (Germany) in the north, the Kufstein and Schwaz districts in the west, and the Pinzgau region (Salzburg) in the east and south.

Area of the district is 1,163.06 km², population was 61,966 (January 1, 2012), and population density 53 persons per km². Administrative center of the district is Kitzbühel.

Administrative divisions 
The district is divided into 20 municipalities, one of them is a town, and three of them are market towns.

Towns 
 Kitzbühel (8,134)

Market towns 
 Fieberbrunn (4,396)
 Hopfgarten im Brixental (5,556)
 Sankt Johann in Tirol (8,734)

Municipalities 
 Aurach bei Kitzbühel (1,125)
 Brixen im Thale (2,673)
 Going am Wilden Kaiser (1,866)
 Hochfilzen (1,139)
 Itter (1,176)
 Jochberg (1,583)
 Kirchberg in Tirol (5,102)
 Kirchdorf in Tirol (3,859)
 Kössen (4,202)
 Oberndorf in Tirol (2,019)
 Reith bei Kitzbühel (1,678)
 Sankt Jakob in Haus (759)
 Sankt Ulrich am Pillersee  (1,609)
 Schwendt (790)
 Waidring (1,946)
 Westendorf (3,620)

(population numbers January 1, 2012)

 
Districts of Tyrol (state)